William Cusano (October 19, 1943 – November 14, 2012) was an Italian-born former politician in Quebec, Canada. He was a member of the National Assembly of Quebec from 1981 to 2007.

Born in Sepino-Campobasso, Italy, Cusano and his family moved to Canada in 1952. He has a Bachelor of Arts from Loyola College as well as from the Université de Montréal in education and was a teacher and director for several schools in the Montreal region from 1962 to 1979.

Cusano was first elected to the National Assembly as a member of the Quebec Liberal Party in the Viau riding in the 1981 elections. He was re-elected in 1985, 1989, 1994, 1998 and 2003 before retiring at the 2007 elections. Cusano highest rank was chief whip of the government during Robert Bourassa's fourth term as Premier of Quebec from 1989 to 1994, while he was the Deputy Whip of the government from 1985 to 1989. Cusano was never named to the Cabinet by Bourassa, Daniel Johnson, Jr. or Jean Charest serving as Parliamentary Secretary of the Minister of Health and Social Services during Johnson's tenure as Premier in 1994.

During Jean Charest's First Mandate, he was named the National Assembly's First Vice-President.

He died in 2012 of complications from surgery.

Electoral record (partial)

References

External links
 

1943 births
Italian emigrants to Canada
People from the Province of Campobasso
Politicians from Montreal
Quebec Liberal Party MNAs
Université de Montréal alumni
2012 deaths
Vice Presidents of the National Assembly of Quebec
21st-century Canadian politicians